Ekiti West is a Local Government Area of Ekiti State, Nigeria. Its headquarters is in the town of Aramoko.
 
It has an area of 366 km and a population of 179,892 at the 2006 census.

The postal code of the area is 362.

References

Local Government Areas in Ekiti State